Drennan Charles Mormino (born November 20, 1983) is a former American football center. He was drafted by the Miami Dolphins in the sixth round in the 2007 NFL Draft. He played college football at Central Michigan.

External links
Central Michigan Chippewas bio
San Diego Chargers bio

1983 births
American football centers
American football offensive guards
Central Michigan Chippewas football players
Living people
Miami Dolphins players
People from Buffalo Grove, Illinois
People from Palmer, Alaska
San Diego Chargers players